Paul Sloan is an American actor and screenwriter.  He has written and acted in the films The Night Crew (2015), Vigilante Diaries (2016) and I Am Wrath (2016).  He is also known for playing Jake Hunter in the 2021 film Every Last One of Them.

Filmography

References

External links
 

Living people
American male film actors
21st-century American male actors
21st-century American screenwriters
American male screenwriters
Year of birth missing (living people)